Lees Hotel in Ingham, Queensland, a Queensland icon, is recognised as the official Pub with No Beer made famous by Slim Dusty's song "A Pub with No Beer".
The 1957 song, which became Australia's first international hit, was based on the poem A Pub Without Beer written by Ingham sugarcane farmer and poet Dan Sheahan in the Day Dawn Hotel, now known as Lees Hotel, in Ingham in 1943.

History

In December 1943, American servicemen from the 22nd Bomb Group passed through Ingham en route to Port Moresby, stopped at the Day Dawn Hotel overnight and drank all the beer. The following day Dan Sheahan rode his horse 30 kilometres to the hotel only to learn there was no beer. He had a glass of wine instead, sat in the pub and wrote the poem.

The poem was published in The North Queensland Register in early 1944 and was rewritten in 1956 by Gordon Parsons, who set it to music for Slim Dusty. Parsons said he did not know where the original poem came from, but when Slim Dusty visited Ingham, he met Dan Sheahan and was shown the original poem, which Slim acknowledged as being the origin of the song. Dan Sheahan didn't want any royalties for the song, only recognition. He went on to write three other songs for Slim.

The Day Dawn Hotel replaced the Telegraph Hotel, which was built on the site in the late 1800s. Lees Hotel replaced the Day Dawn Hotel in 1960.

Recognition

Controversy surrounded the identity of the hotel when a pub in New South Wales claimed to be the original pub where the song was created, but in his autobiography Walk a Country Mile, Slim Dusty confirmed the song was created in the Day Dawn Hotel in Ingham.

In 1986, The Australian Bicentennial Heritage and Environment Program gave recognition to Lees Hotel as the official Pub with No Beer and acknowledged Dan Sheahan as the author of the poem. A Queensland Government committee visited Ingham and erected a plaque of recognition outside Lees Hotel.

Festival

A Pub with No Beer Festival was held in April 2013 at Lees to commemorate the 70th anniversary of the event.

2012 refurbishment

Lees Hotel underwent a million-dollar refurbishment in 2012 and now includes artifacts, photographic history and memorabilia of Ingham's early days as well as a tribute to Dan Sheahan and Slim Dusty.

References

External links
Lees Hotel website
Slim Dusty, 1957, A Pub with No Beer

Hotels in Queensland